Hiram Township is one of the eighteen townships of Portage County, Ohio, United States.  The 2020 census listed 2,396 people in the township.

Geography
Located in the northern part of the county, it borders the following other townships:
Troy Township, Geauga County - north
Parkman Township, Geauga County - northwest corner
Nelson Township - east
Freedom Township - south
Shalersville Township - southwest corner
Mantua Township - west
Auburn Township, Geauga County - northwest corner

Two villages are formed from portions of Hiram Township: part of Garrettsville in the southeast, and Hiram in the center.  According to the website of Hiram Township, the portion of Hiram Township once adjoining Windham Township is no longer a part of Hiram Township, having been annexed by the village of Garrettsville.

Name and history
Hiram Township was named after Hiram I, the biblical king of Tyre. It is the only Hiram Township statewide.

A small hamlet called Hiram Rapids was located in the northwest part of the township. A post office was established there in 1840, and remained in operation until 1912.

Johnson Farm

John Johnson, Sr. moved his family from Vermont to Hiram Township in 1818, where they established the John Johnson Farm.  After reading the Book of Mormon, Johnson and his wife Elsa traveled to Kirtland to meet with Latter Day Saint movement founder Joseph Smith The Johnsons invited Smith to live with them, and Smith made the Johnson Farm his residence and the temporary headquarters of the Church of Christ (Latter Day Saints) in September 1831.

Several other apostles and notables of the Church of Jesus Christ of Latter-day Saints resided or were frequent guests at the Johnson Farm. Among these were John Johnson's sons, Luke and Lyman; as well as Sidney Rigdon and Orson Hyde.  Section 76 of the Doctrine and Covenants was received at the Johnson Farm on February 16, 1832. The LDS Church holds that several other revelations were received at the Johnson Farm, and that Smith worked on translating the Bible here.

Government
The township is governed by a three-member board of trustees, who are elected in November of odd-numbered years to a four-year term beginning on the following January 1. Two are elected in the year after the presidential election and one is elected in the year before it. There is also an elected township fiscal officer, who serves a four-year term beginning on April 1 of the year after the election, which is held in November of the year before the presidential election. Vacancies in the fiscal officership or on the board of trustees are filled by the remaining trustees.

Notable people
Bridget Franek, 2012 United States Olympic athlete in 3000 meter steeplechase, grew up in the township
John Johnson, early leader in the Latter Day Saint movement and owner of the John Johnson Farm; lived in the township from 1818 to 1833
Luke Johnson, early leader in the Latter Day Saint movement and son of John Johnson; raised in Hiram Township
Lyman Johnson, early leader in the Latter Day Saint movement and son of John Johnson; raised in Hiram Township
Sidney Rigdon, early leader in the Latter Day Saint movement, lived in the township from 1831 to 1832 near the John Johnson Farm
Joseph Smith, founder of the Latter Day Saint movement, lived in Hiram Township from 1831 to 1832 at the John Johnson Farm

References

External links

 County website

Townships in Portage County, Ohio
Significant places in Mormonism
Townships in Ohio